Çökəkoba (also, Çökəkova and Chokakoba) is a village in the Zaqatala Rayon of Azerbaijan.  The village forms part of the municipality of Göyəm.

References

External links 

Populated places in Zaqatala District